The Rakh Branch is a canal in the Punjab province of Pakistan. 

The canal was dug in 1892 during British India colonial rule. The Rakh Branch originates from canal Lower Chenab. And Lower Chenab comes out from Head Khanki at the river Chenab. It passes and produces tributaries in three districts such as Hafizabad, Nankana Sahib and Faisalabad. Many famous towns are situated at near the Rakh Branch such as Safdarabad, Sangla Hill, Salarwala, Chak Jhumra, Gatwala, Abdullahpur and Faisalabad. The canal ends at Samundri. A total of 215 Villages situated and their subsequent land is irrigated through Rakh Branch. All of these villages name end with R.B (Rakh Branch) and start with the no of mogha (source of water point from canal) like 1 R.B, 68 RB etc.

References

Canals in Pakistan
Canals opened in 1892